Brama orcini is a species of Perciformes in the family Bramidae.

References 

orcini
Animals described in 1831